Malik Ammon Benlevi (born March 20, 1997) is an American professional basketball player for the Saskatchewan Rattlers of the Canadian Elite Basketball League (CEBL). He played college basketball player for the Georgia State Panthers.

High school career
Benlevi attended Jenkins High School in Savannah, Georgia. He averaged 13.8 points, 5.6 rebounds, 2.0 steals and 1.5 assists per game as a junior. Benlevi led the team to a Region 3-AAAAA title and to the Class AAAAA Final Four, and was an All-Savannah Morning News first-team selection. As a senior, he averaged 16.7 points and 6.2 rebounds per game, earning Region 1-AAA Player of the Year as well as all-state first-team honors from the Atlanta Journal-Constitution. Benlevi led Jenkins to its first state championship, scoring 12 points in the title game against Morgan County High School. He committed to play college basketball at Georgia State over offers from South Carolina State and Kennesaw State.

College career
Benlevi rarely played as a freshman, but averaged 8.5 points and 4.2 rebounds per game as a sophomore. As a junior, he averaged 9.6 points, 6.5 rebounds and 1.7 assists per game. During his senior season, Benlevi frequently played center due to injuries to the team's big men. In the championship game of the Sun Belt Conference tournament, he scored 16 points and grabbed 11 rebounds in a 73–64 win against UT Arlington, and he was named Most Outstanding Player. Benlevi averaged 11.9 points and 5.8 rebounds per game.

Professional career
After going undrafted in the 2019 NBA draft, Benlevi signed his first professional contract with Ostioneros de Guaymas of the Mexican Circuito de Baloncesto de la Costa del Pacífico. He averaged 11.4 points, 5.7 rebounds and 1.2 assists per game. In October 2019, Benlevi signed with the Salt Lake City Stars of the NBA G League. During the 2019–20 season, he averaged 5.8 points, 3.2 rebounds, 1.4 assists, and 18.5 minutes in 37 games and on the next one, he had 7.7 points, 3.4 rebounds, 1 assist, and 19.7 minutes in 11 games.

Iowa Wolves (2021–2022)
On August 3, 2021, Benlevi signed with Grindavík of the Icelandic league, but did not play for the team, and in October 2021, Benlevi joined the Iowa Wolves. Benlevi was then later waived on February 28, 2022. Benlevi was reacquired by the Iowa Wolves on March 10, 2022. He averaged 6.4 points, 3.9 rebounds, 0.7 assists, and 16.1 minutes in 27 games while setting his career-high at 5 blocks per game.

Saskatchewan Rattlers (2022–present)
On April 12, 2022, Benlevi signed with the Saskatchewan Rattlers of the CEBL.

References

External links
Georgia State Panthers bio

1997 births
Living people
American men's basketball players
American expatriate basketball people in Canada
American expatriate basketball people in Mexico
Basketball players from Savannah, Georgia
Iowa Wolves players
Georgia State Panthers men's basketball players
Salt Lake City Stars players
Saskatchewan Rattlers players
Small forwards